"The Lost Leader" is an 1845 poem by Robert Browning first published in his book Dramatic Romances and Lyrics. It berates William Wordsworth for what Browning considered his desertion of the liberal cause, and his lapse from his high idealism. More generally, it is an attack on any liberal leader who has deserted his cause. It is one of Browning's "best known, if not actually best, poems".

Text

Context
From an early age, Browning (b. 1812) had been an admirer of the (early) works of Wordsworth (b. 1770). As  observes, Browning had sought to become "Wordsworth's radical successor", and his attitude towards Wordsworth was "a test model of a strong poet's quest for self-definition against an overbearing predecessor". The poem's lines "We that had loved him so, followed him, honoured him, / ... / Made him our pattern to live and to die!" refer to this. However, when he began to perceive Wordsworth sliding into conservative politics and the Church of England, he became increasingly disillusioned. Wordsworth in his early days had been a youthful rebel, defended Paine's Rights of Man and the French Revolution, and been described by Coleridge as a 'semi-atheist', and by himself as a 'patriot of the world'. However, as England went to war against France, the condition in France deteriorated, the Reign of Terror came to be, and Robespierre was executed, Wordsworth became disillusioned, and, following Southey and Coleridge, "gave up his revolutionary dreams and settled down to the life of a recluse".

Browning's poem Sordello, written between 1836 and 1840, was partly aimed as a "correction" of Wordsworth's politics and poetics, but neither the audience nor Wordsworth saw this; instead the poem acquired a reputation for incomprehensibility, and Browning was called "the madman who had foisted the unreadable Sordello upon the world". For his part, Wordsworth seems to have thought very little of Browning, and one of the few recorded statements he made about Browning was in a letter written to a friend on the occasion of Browning's wedding in 1846 to Elizabeth Barrett: 

In 1813 Wordsworth obtained the position of distributor of stamps. This government position was already sufficient to induce Shelley to write a sonnet of mild reprimand, "To Wordsworth". In 1842 he accepted a civil list pension of £300 from the government, and in 1843 when Southey died, he accepted the position of Poet Laureate. Browning saw this acquiescence to orthodox tradition—with its image of Wordsworth literally on his knees in front of the queen—as his "final surrender to the forces of conservatism". The poem arose from the resulting hatred and indignation, and was published in November 1845, in Dramatic Romances and Lyrics.

The "handful of silver" is a reference to thirty pieces of silver, a phrase associated with betrayal or selling out. The lines "he boasts his quiescence / Still bidding crouch whom the rest bade aspire" referred to what Browning saw as one of Wordsworth's worst crimes as the lost leader, that of boasting his acquiescence and instructing the oppressed masses to patiently "crouch" and bear their burden instead of rising up in revolt. This Wordsworth had done in his 1833 poem called "The Warning".

Wordsworth died five years later, in 1850. Browning later came to slightly regret the poem, and possibly even to see Wordsworth in a positive light again, as he made a few minor revisions, moderating the poem's attack. However, Baker writes that "His attack on Wordsworth was not as unfair as some have claimed, and as Browning seems to have feared in later life", and Robert Wilson Lynd writes, of Browning's views:

Reception
The poem was widely anthologised, and recognised for its direct attack. One editor wrote:

Another wrote that the verses "have more bad feeling than poetry". Stephen Fry quotes the poem as an example of the use of dactylic metre to great effect, creating verse with "great rhythmic dash and drive". The poem is not in pure dactylic tetrameter, but catalectic.

There was much discussion on whether the poem was addressed to Wordsworth. In response to queries, Browning always made it clear that the poem was based on Wordsworth, but stopped short of saying that it was directly addressed to Wordsworth himself, instead saying that the portrait was "purposely disguised a little, used in short as an artist uses a model, retaining certain characteristic traits, and discarding the rest". Thus the poem was on the Lost Leader in the abstract, with Wordsworth being the most prominent concrete example. In one ambivalent letter, he wrote:

Literary allusions
The Lost Leader was used as the title of a book about Wordsworth by Hugh I'Anson Fausset in 1933.

The Lost Leader is the title of a book of poems by Mick Imlah, published in 2008.

The poem was parodied by Fun (a Victorian competitor of Punch) when the women of Girton College dissolved their Browning Society and spent the funds on chocolate. The lines began: "They just for a handful of chocolate left us / Just for some sweetmeats to put in their throats".
In one edition of the poem, the first line had been printed as "Just for a handle of silver he left us", which the proof-reader tried to justify on the grounds that as no one understood Browning, it would be all right.

Nigel Birch attacked the Macmillan government with the words "Never glad confident morning again".

The title of Joe Haines's memoir of the final years of Prime Minister Harold Wilson's government, Glimmers of Twilight, alludes to the poem.

The poem is frequently alluded to by Horace Rumpole.

The lines "We that had loved him so, followed him, honoured him, / ... / Made him our pattern to live and to die!" are framed as the deciding quiz bowl question in Nan Willard Kappo's Cheating Lessons, published in 2002.

An excerpt of the poem is featured in Cassandra Clare's Clockwork Angel published in 2010.

Different approaches to the poem—personal idiosyncratic approaches and those informed by historical context or metrical structure—are discussed as an introduction to "cognitive poetics".

Bhagat Singh, an Indian Marxist Revolutionary and Indian Independence Freedom Fighter used this poem "The Lost Leader", pointing at Lala Lajpat Rai, an Indian Nationalist Freedom Fighter, who turned to communalist politics in his last years.

Notes

References
 
 Laura Dabundo, Review (of Browning and Wordsworth) for The Wordsworth Circle, Autumn 2005

Poetry by Robert Browning
1845 poems